The Fruitless Tree (L'arbre sans fruit) is a Nigerien bilingual documentary film written and directed by Aïcha Macky on her directorial debut. The documentary project was influenced and inspired by the death of director's own mother who died when the director was only five years old at the time. The documentary won the Africa Movie Academy Award for Best Documentary at the 12th Africa Movie Academy Awards in 2016.

Cast 

 Aïcha Macky as herself

Synopsis 
The director who is a married woman without any children in real life, confronts with the issue of infertility which is a concern in Niger. She shares a collection of stories about wives and husbands who refuse to be tested.

References

External links 

 

2016 films
2016 documentary films
Nigerien documentary films
2010s French-language films
Hausa-language films
2016 directorial debut films